The Duke William is a Grade II listed public house at 2 St John's Square, Stoke-on-Trent, Staffordshire, England, ST6 3AJ.

It was built in 1929, and Grade II listed in 2015 by Historic England.

References

Grade II listed pubs in Staffordshire